Berdkunk is a village in the Gavar Municipality of the Gegharkunik Province of Armenia.

Etymology 
The village was previously known as Aghkala or Aghgala, consisting of Turkic agh (ağ, meaning "white") and Arabic gala (qala, meaning "castle" or "tower"). Berdkunk is a combination of two words in Armenian: berd (բերդ, meaning "fortress") and kunk (կունք, meaning "place" or "foundation").

History 
The village was once a transit point on the ancient road between Dvin and Partev. There are cyclopean fortresses nearby with megalithic tombs. One of the fortresses in particular, Berdkunk Fortress (also known as Ishkhanats Amrots and Spitak Berd ), is located along the eastern edge of the village and was built in the 10th century BC. There is also an 11–12th century church, a 12–20th century cemetery, and 16–17th century tombstones in the village.

Berdkunk, then known as Aghkala, was part of the Nor Bayazet uezd of the Erivan Governorate within the Russian Empire. Bournoutian presents the statistics of the village in the early 20th century as follows:

Economy 
The population of the village is engaged with animal husbandry, cultivation of forage crops and potatoes.

Demographics 
The population of the village since 1831 is as follows:

Gallery

References

External links 

 
 

Populated places in Gegharkunik Province
Former Azerbaijani inhabited settlements